Al Bidaoui is a commuter rail system serving Casablanca in Morocco. It serves several train stations in Casablanca such as Casa-Voyageurs, Casa-Port and Mohammed V International Airport.

History 
After the growth in the region of Casablanca, ONCF started constructing a railway line to go through the region and created the TNR line between Casablanca and the airport in 1993. Starting from 1 July 2002, the line has been improved and called Al Bidaoui.

Naming 
The system was first called TNR Casablanca - Airport until 2002 when it was renamed Al Bidaoui which is an adjective in Arabic describing people and things from the region of Casablanca.

Stations

Extensions 
There are plans to extend the line to include more station until Mohammedia to the north.

Future line R1 (planned for 2020)

Future network map of Casablanca RER (planned for 2030)

External links
 Al Bidaoui Official website
 ONCF Official website

References 

Public transport in Morocco
Transport in Casablanca